The Mitchell gudgeon (Kimberleyeleotris hutchinsi) is a species of fish in the family Eleotridae endemic to the Kimberley region of Australia, where it is only known from the Mitchell River system. The specific name honours the ichthyologist J. Barry Hutchins (b. 1946) of the Western Australian Museum, who collected the type.

References

Mitchell gudgeon
Near threatened animals
Taxonomy articles created by Polbot
Mitchell gudgeon